Cyanidiaceae is a family of red algae, one of two families in the Division Cyanidiophytina.

References

Red algae families